The thyrocervical trunk is an artery of the neck. It is a branch of the subclavian artery. It arises from the first portion of this vessel, between the origin of the subclavian artery and the inner border of the scalenus anterior muscle. It is located distally to the vertebral artery and proximally to the costocervical trunk. It gives off a number of branches to the neck. It helps to supply blood to the muscles of the neck.

Structure 
The thyrocervical trunk is a branch of the subclavian artery. It arises from the first portion of this vessel, between the origin of the subclavian artery and the inner border of the scalenus anterior muscle. It is located distally to the vertebral artery and proximally to the costocervical trunk. It is short and thick.

Branches 
The thyrocervical trunk divides soon after its origin into a number of branches. 
 Inferior thyroid artery.
 Suprascapular artery.
 Transverse cervical artery. This is present in about 1/3 of cases. In the rest, the dorsal scapular and superficial cervical arteries arise separately.
The suprascapular artery and transverse cervical artery both head laterally and cross in front of (anterior to) the scalenus anterior muscle and the phrenic nerve. The inferior thyroid artery runs superiorly from the thyrocervical trunk to the inferior portion of the thyroid gland. There is significant variation in the origin of these vessels.

These branches explain the alternative name for this blood vessel: the "truncus thyrobicervicoscapularis".

Function 
The thyrocervical trunk helps to supply blood to the muscles of the neck.

Additional images

References

External links 
 
 

sv:A. Truncus thyrocervicalis

Arteries of the head and neck